Nathan Connolly (born 20 January 1981) is a Northern Irish musician, who is best known as the lead guitarist and backing vocalist for alternative rock band Snow Patrol.

Early life
Connolly, who was born in Belfast, Northern Ireland, sang for a gospel church choir at Glenmachan, Church of God, Belfast when he was 16, and the experience, he says, is what inspired him to be a musician.

He is a former pupil of Grosvenor Grammar School.

Music career
Prior to joining Snow Patrol, Connolly was a member of a band called File Under Easy Listening (or F.U.E.L), who were managed by BBC Radio 1 DJ Colin Murray. The band consisted of Connolly, vocalist Aaron Ditty, Dave Magee and Peter Comfort. Unfortunately, it did not last long; the single "Closure/Dryform" was F.U.E.L.'s first and only release.

While working at the record store HMV in Belfast, Connolly was introduced to the band Snow Patrol. He reluctantly agreed to join, despite the fact that the band had no record deal at the time. He jokingly recalls his mother thinking he "was being kidnapped by rock stars."

Connolly became a permanent member of the band near the end of 2002. His recruitment played a large role in shaping the band's new sound.  With Connolly as a composer of the band's new material, Snow Patrol garnered a new record deal and released Final Straw in 2003. The album proved to be the band's breakthrough and helped introduce them to a wide audience.

In late 2006, he talked about plans to record a solo album, which he said would be "melodic and tuneful".

In 2013, Connolly formed his own side project called Little Matador.

More recently Connolly played with Feeder live at the Isle Of Wight festival on Sunday 12 June 2016.

Equipment

Guitars
 Gibson Les Paul Custom - Tobacco 1979
 Gibson Les Paul Custom - Ebony (appears in the video for Take Back the City)
 Fender Telecaster  Custom - Sunburst 1974
 Fender Telecaster  Custom - Blonde 1977
 Gretsch Countryman - Brown 1962
 Gretsch  Duo Jet - Black
 Fender Jaguar  - Sunburst 1965
 Fender Telecaster Custom - Black '72 reissue
 Fender Telecaster Nashville - Sunburst
 Guild Acoustic
 Rickenbacker 360 - Jetglo
 Hutchins Memphis - Black
He uses Jim Dunlop Tortex .60mm picks

Amps 
 Diamond Amplification Spitfire I Head with Spitfire 4x12 Cabinet
 Vox AC30 (Used at Mandela Hall SG#3)
 Marshall JCM800 2203 Jubilees
 Marshall 3315 Transistor (Used on Final Straw Tours)
Fender Twin Reverb (Also Used on Final Straw Tours)

Effects
Connolly uses a setup that is primarily rack based. His rack consists of the following:

TC Electronic D Two (for delay)
TC Electronic G Major (for modulation, pitch shifting and compression)
TC Electronic M One XL (for reverb and layered delay sounds)
Voodoo Labs GCX Audio Switcher

He uses various pedals for his overdrive and boost sounds. They change from time to time, but his consistent setup includes the following:

Ibanez TS9 Tubescreamer
MXR/Dunlop Micro Amp (for boost)
Boss Super Overdrive
Boss Blues Driver

He uses a Voodoo Labs Ground Control Pro controller to bring up presets for each of the band's songs, and has the ability to add/remove different pedals and changes in sound.

He also uses a function in the TC Electronic G Major that allows him to switch the channels on his Marshall Jubilee amp heads for his heaviest sounds.

Connolly has a small pedalboard containing his ground control for the rack and various Boss pedals including a TU-2, PS-5, DD3, and RC-2.

Personal life
Connolly lives in Crouch End, London, nearby bandmate Jonny Quinn.

References

External links
 Snow Patrol's Nathan Connolly: 'Guitar Is Just Another Tool To Create A Song'
 Snow Patrol's Sith Obsession
 PopGurls Interview: Nathan Connolly

Rock guitarists from Northern Ireland
Snow Patrol members
Musicians from Belfast
1981 births
Living people
Ivor Novello Award winners
People educated at Grosvenor Grammar School